With a Boy Like U is the official title of the debut solo album by Kary Ng, released on January 31, 2006. It is more commonly known among English speakers as With a Boy Like You.

Track listing
All songs are sung in Cantonese unless stated.

1. "With A Boy Like U"
Language: English
2. "戀愛天才" "Love Talent"
3. "句句我愛你" (Guei Guei Ngo Ngoi Nei) "Everyword Is I love You"
4. "愛你變成恨你" "My love for you has turn to hate"
5. "假想敵" "Imaginary Enemy"
6. "耍我" (Sa Ngo) "Need Me"
7. "明知做戲" (Ming Ji Jo Hei) "Intentional Act"
8. "欣澳別戀" "Joyful Australia Do not Love"
9. "給情敵的情書" "For Love Rivals Love Letter"
10. "南方的風"(Nan Fang de Feng) "South Wind"
Language: Mandarin
11. "台北四天三夜"(Tai Pei Shi Tian San Ye) Taipei Four Days, Three Nights)
Language: Mandarin

References

2006 debut albums
Kary Ng albums